Illela may refer to:

Illela, Nigeria, a Local Government Area in Sokoto State, Nigeria
Illela, Niger, a town and urban commune in Niger